Rusanovo is a rural locality in Kosteltsevsky Selsoviet Rural Settlement, Kurchatovsky District, Kursk Oblast, Russia. Population:

Geography 
The village is located on the Prutishche River in the basin of the Seym, 79 km from the Russia–Ukraine border, 41 km north-west of Kursk, 23.5 km north of the district center – the town Kurchatov, 7.5 km from the selsoviet center – Kosteltsevo.

 Climate
Rusanovo has a warm-summer humid continental climate (Dfb in the Köppen climate classification).

Transport 
Rusanovo is located 25 km from the federal route  Crimea Highway, 23 km from the road of regional importance  (Kursk – Lgov – Rylsk – border with Ukraine), 18 km from the road  (Lgov – Konyshyovka), 0.2 km from the road of intermunicipal significance  (38K-017 – Nikolayevka – Shirkovo), 23.5 km from the nearest railway halt Kurchatow (railway line Lgov I — Kursk).

The rural locality is situated 46 km from Kursk Vostochny Airport, 150 km from Belgorod International Airport and 247 km from Voronezh Peter the Great Airport.

References

Notes

Sources

Rural localities in Kurchatovsky District, Kursk Oblast